Johan Philip Korn  (30 August 1727 – 29 March 1796) was a Swedish painter.

Biography
Korn was born at Uddevalla in Västra Götaland County, Sweden. He was the son of Filip Ludvig Korn (1698-1741) and Maria Elfwing (1708-1742). He first began his career as a decorative painter. He was a student of artist Johan Sevenbom (1721-1784). After further studies he changed to landscape painting in the Rococo style of French artist François Boucher (1703–1770).

In 1759, Korn became master of the Stockholm Painting Office (Stockholms målarämbete) and held this position  until his death. Korn became a member (agré)  at the  Swedish Royal Academy of Fine Arts  in 1777.

References

Other sources
 Korn, Johan Philip in Profile (1st edition, 1884)
 Carlquist, Gunnar, ed (1933). Swedish dictionary. Bd 15. Malmö: Swedish Uppslagsbok AB. Sid. 1091-92

1728 births
1796 deaths
18th-century Swedish painters
18th-century Swedish male artists
Swedish male painters
People from Uddevalla Municipality